Reis Malile (August 12, 1924 – March 6, 2003) was an Albanian politician and army officer. He served as the Foreign Minister of the People's Socialist Republic of Albania from 1982 to 1991. He also led a partisan battalion during World War II and served as the Permanent Representative of Albania to the United Nations from 1958 to 1961.

Biography 

Reis Malile was born on 12 August 1924. During World War II, Malile led a partisan battalion active in the Drenica region of Kosovo. 

From 1958 to 1961, Malile served as the Permanent Representative of Albania to the United Nations. From 1961, Malile served as the Albanian Ambassador to China, continuing in this post until after the Sino-Albanian split. Malile also served as the Albanian Ambassador to the Democratic Republic of Vietnam in this time. 

On 30 June 1982, Malile became the Albanian Foreign Minister. He continued to serve in this post until 22 February 1991, when the communist regime in Albania collapsed.

References 

1932 births
2003 deaths
20th-century Albanian people
Ambassadors of Albania to China
Permanent Representatives of Albania to the United Nations